Gevheri  was a Turkish folk poet who is estimated to have lived in the 17th century. In 1998, In the work titled "Gevherî Divanı", published by Şükrü Elçin, 945 poems of the poet included in the cönks and manuscripts were brought together.

Biography 
There is no definite information about the date of birth of Gevherî, who is one of the 17th century poets. Although many researchers, especially Fuad Köprülü, claim that Gevherî was born in the first half of the 17th century, based on some of his poems, the existence of those who do not agree with this view does not escape attention.

Bibliography

Poem's 
 Beyaz Göğsün Bana Karşı 
 Bir Elâ Gözlüden Şikayetim Var 
 Bizden Selam Olsun Gül Yüzlü Yare 
 Bugün Ben Bir Bağa Girdim 
 Bugün Ben Bir Güzel Gördüm 
 Bülbül Ne Yatarsın Yaz Bahar Oldu 
 Dağlara Gel (Ozan Erhan Çerkezoğlu ve Grup Yorum Seslendirmiştir)
 Dila Gör Bu Cihan İçre 
 Ela Gözlerini Sevdiğim Dilber
 Ey Benim Nazlı Cananım 
 Ey Peri Cihana Sen Gibi Dilber 
 Garip Turna Bizi Senden Sorana 
 Hey Ağalar Bir Sevdaya Uğradım 
 Hey Ağalar Zaman Azdı 
 Mecnun'a Dönmüşüm Bilmem Gezdiğim 
 Sözün Bilmez Bazı Nadan Elinden 
 Şunda Bir Dilbere Gönül Düşürdüm
 Bulunmaz
 Emanet Etmişsin Geldi Selamın

References 

Divan poets from the Ottoman Empire